The Sierra Barrosa Formation is a geologic formation of the Neuquén Basin in the northern Patagonian provinces of Mendoza and Neuquén. The formation dates to the Late Cretaceous, middle to late Coniacian, and belongs to the Río Neuquén Subgroup of the Neuquén Group. The formation overlies the Los Bastos Formation and is overlain by the Plottier Formation. As the underlying Los Bastos Formation, the Sierra Barrosa Formation comprises mudstones and sandstones deposited in a fluvial environment.

Description 
The formation was named by Garrido in 2010 as sandy unit conformably and transitionally overlying the Los Bastos Formation, which in turns overlies the Portezuelo Formation within which both units were formerly included. The formation in the same manner underlies the Plottier Formation, all belonging to the Río Neuquén Subgroup of the Neuquén Group in the Neuquén Basin. The unit now known as Sierra Barrosa Formation was included in the original definition by Herrero Ducloux (1938, 1939) as "Portezuelo Superior", as part of the "Portezuelo Beds" he described.

The type locality of the formation is located at the southern edge of the eponymous Sierra Barrosa, to the east of Cerro Challacó. The formation comprises fine-to-medium grained sandstones intercalated by thin levels of mudstones. The formation has similar lithological characteristics as the Portezuelo Formation and was deposited in a fluvial environment characterized by highly sinuous channels. Based on the stratigraphic relations with the overlying and underlying units, the age has been estimated to be middle to late Coniacian.

Fossil content 
The formation has provided fossils of:
 Dinosaurs
 Kaijutitan maui
 Macrogryphosaurus gondwanicus
 Mendozasaurus neguyelap
Murusraptor barrosaensis
 Maniraptora indet.
 Allosauroidea indet.

See also 
 List of dinosaur bearing rock formations

References

Bibliography 

 
 
 
 

Geologic formations of Argentina
Neuquén Group
Upper Cretaceous Series of South America
Cretaceous Argentina
Coniacian Stage
Mudstone formations
Sandstone formations
Fluvial deposits
Fossiliferous stratigraphic units of South America
Paleontology in Argentina
Geology of Mendoza Province
Geology of Neuquén Province
Geology of Patagonia